Leonhard Weiß (26 July 1907 – 18 August 1981) was a German international footballer.

References

1907 births
1981 deaths
Association football forwards
German footballers
Germany international footballers
1. FC Nürnberg players